The Albert Sweet House is a historic house located at 179 Highland Street in Taunton, Massachusetts.

Description and history 
The -story, wood-framed house was built sometime in the 1870s, and is a particularly picturesque example of Second Empire styling. It has a mansard roof, with bracketed gable dormers framing round-arch windows, and an off-center entry topped by a 2-1/2 level tower. The cornices of the tower roof, the main roof, and that of a side rectangular bay are all decorated with brackets.

The house was listed on the National Register of Historic Places on July 5, 1984.

See also
National Register of Historic Places listings in Taunton, Massachusetts

References

Houses in Taunton, Massachusetts
National Register of Historic Places in Taunton, Massachusetts
Houses on the National Register of Historic Places in Bristol County, Massachusetts
Second Empire architecture in Massachusetts